The Master Detective is a 1944 German comedy film directed by Hubert Marischka and starring Rudolf Platte who plays a private detective. The film's art direction was by Gustav A. Knauer and Arthur Schwarz.

Cast
In alphabetical order
Georg Alexander as Rittmeister a. D. Hans-Heinz Langendorff
Hermann Brix as Neffe Helmut Langendorff
Will Dohm as Diener Balduin
Fritz Kampers as Nachbar Eberhard Matthesius
Dorit Kreysler as Ballett-Tänzerin Ilse Braun
Rudolf Platte as Privatdetektiv Bruch
Erich Ponto as Gutsbesitzer Theobald Langendorff
Charlotte Schultz as Gesellschafterin Agathe
Grethe Weiser as Julia Langendorff

References

External links

1944 comedy films
Films of Nazi Germany
German comedy films
Films directed by Hubert Marischka
German black-and-white films
1940s German films